Littleborough railway station serves the town of Littleborough in the Metropolitan Borough of Rochdale, Greater Manchester, England.

It lies on the Caldervale Line 13¾ miles (22 km) north of Manchester Victoria towards Halifax, Bradford Interchange and Leeds.

This is the last station on the Caldervale Line in the Greater Manchester area.  It was one of the original Manchester and Leeds Railway station sites and for the first year of operation following its opening in July 1839, it was the temporary terminus of the line from Manchester (the section on through the Summit Tunnel towards Mirfield not being completed until 1841).  It did so again for some eight months after the December 1984 Summit Tunnel fire - passengers transferring between the trains to/from Manchester and a rail-replacement bus service onwards to Todmorden until repairs to the tunnel could be completed and the line reopened.

Facilities
The station's two platforms are staggered, with the Manchester-bound one (platform 1) the more southerly.  Both have ramps & step-free access for disabled travellers.  The station is staffed on a part-time basis (six days per week, mornings & early afternoons only), with the ticket office & waiting room on platform 2 open at these times.  There are also shelters on both platforms & ticket vending machines available, so travellers can purchase tickets when the booking office is closed.

Services

Monday to Saturday daytimes, there is a half-hourly service from Littleborough to Manchester Victoria westbound and to Todmorden eastbound, with trains running alternately to Leeds via Dewsbury and to Blackburn via  (the latter beginning at the May 2015 timetable change).  Westbound trains continue beyond Manchester via Atherton to  since the May 2018 timetable change.

In the early morning, late evening and on Sundays, trains to Leeds operate via Halifax rather than Dewsbury; the basic service pattern remains the same though.

References

External links

Railway stations in the Metropolitan Borough of Rochdale
DfT Category F2 stations
Former Lancashire and Yorkshire Railway stations
Railway stations in Great Britain opened in 1839
Northern franchise railway stations
Littleborough, Greater Manchester